The 1999–2000 Macedonian Football Cup was the 8th season of Macedonia's football knockout competition. FK Vardar were the defending champions, having won their fourth title. The 1999–2000 champions were FK Sloga Jugomagnat who won their second title.

Competition calendar

Source:

First round

|}

Group stage

Group 1

Group 2

Group 3

Group 4

Quarter-finals
The first legs were played on 15 March and second were played on 22 March 2000.

|}

Semi-finals
The first legs were played on 5 April and the second were played on 19 and 20 April 2000.

Summary

|}

Matches

Pobeda won 4–3 on aggregate.

Sloga Jugomagnat won 4–2 on aggregate.

Final

See also
1999–2000 Macedonian First Football League
1999–2000 Macedonian Second Football League

References

External links
 1999–2000 Macedonian Football Cup at rsssf.org
 Official Website
 Macedonian Football

Macedonia
Cup
Macedonian Football Cup seasons